Oru Naal Oru Kanavu is a 2005 Indian Tamil-language romantic drama film directed by Fazil. Srikanth and Sonia Agarwal play the lead roles, music was by Ilaiyaraaja and it was shot by Anandakuttan.  The film released on 26 August 2005 to average reviews.

Plot
The story revolves around Maya (Sonia Agarwal), a college student, who always wants to triumph in all her endeavors. She comes across a middle class youth, Cheenu (Srikanth), a happy-go-lucky-youngster, who strives to work hard to get his sisters married well.

A few encounters (Maya and Cheenu) result in wordy duels between them leading to Maya challenging Cheenu that she will make him fall in love with her. Her further course of action to achieve her challenge leaves Cheenu frustrated and he decides to take revenge on her by pretending to fall in love with her.

Maya, who starts to spend more time with Cheenu discovers his kindness and eventually develops an honest love towards him. She even helps him in setting his own business house. Slowly Cheenu too realises Maya's nobleness and generosity and falls in love with her.

Trouble comes in the form of her brothers who threaten Cheenu of dire consequences. Cheenu resolves to earn more and become rich and then hold the hands of Maya. But Maya has other plans. Whether or not the couple marries forms the rest of the story.

Cast

 Srikanth as Srinivsan (Cheenu)
 Sonia Agarwal as Mayadevi (Maya)
 Nizhalgal Ravi
 Madhupal as Sekhar
 Remya Nambeesan as Vanaja
 Saranya Mohan as Meera
 Sudha as Cheenu's mother
 Ilavarasu as Rajamani
 Sridevi as Vasanthi
 Suvarna Mathew as Maya's sister
 Bombay Gnanam
 K. V. Prasad as Srikanth's father
 Sathyan as Kumara
 Shyam Ganesh
 Kadhal Sukumar as Saravana
 Scissor Manohar as Broker
 Nellai Siva

Music
The soundtrack was done by Ilaiyaraaja. The song "Kaatril Varum Geethame" was penned by Vali and was considered an instant hit by music lovers.

References

External links
 

2005 romantic comedy films
Indian romantic comedy films
2005 films
Films directed by Fazil
Films scored by Ilaiyaraaja
2000s Tamil-language films